Houston Longino Welch (c. 1900 - May 1969) was an American track and field athlete for Georgia Tech. A native of Covington County, Mississippi, he won the pole vault competition at the first NCAA track and field championships in 1921 with a jump of 12 feet.  Welch graduated from Georgia Tech in 1923 with a degree in electrical engineering.

After graduating from Georgia Tech, Welch worked with various companies in the 1920s. In 1929, he joined Mississippi Power. He began in the company's Gulfport office before transferring to Hattiesburg in 1935.

He was inducted into the Georgia Tech Athletics Hall of Fame in 1966.

Welch died in 1969 at age 69 at his home in Hattiesburg.

See also
 1921 NCAA Men's Track and Field Championships

References

American male pole vaulters
Georgia Tech Yellow Jackets men's track and field athletes
1969 deaths
Year of birth uncertain